Liza on Demand is an American comedy series created by Deborah Kaplan, Harry Elfont, and Liza Koshy that premiered on June 27, 2018, on YouTube Premium. The series stars Koshy, Kimiko Glenn, and Travis Coles and follows Koshy as a "tasker" who completes odd jobs around Los Angeles via a phone application. The series was renewed for a second season which premiered on September 25, 2019. In January 2020, the series was renewed for a third and final season, premiering and concluding in October 2021.

Premise
Liza on Demand follows "chaotic misadventures that ensue as the eponymous character takes on various gigs, tasks and odd jobs in her quest to climb the ranks and become an 'elite tasker'."

Cast and characters

Main
Liza Koshy as Liza Hertzler, a "tasker" who is trying to make it to "elite status" in her job working for the app, Taskit.
Travis Coles as Oliver, Liza's roommate and close friend who works for a real estate company.
Kimiko Glenn as Harlow, Liza's roommate and close friend who owns a show dog named Bark-Paul Gosselaar.

Recurring
Jim O'Heir as Don

Guest

Noah Schnapp as Evan M. ("Pilot"), a rude teenage Uber rider. Also appears in Season 2, Episode 9 (“ New Year’s Eve”) as Trevor, the son of Mrs. Schulz.
Jennifer Esposito as Holly ("Pilot"), a mother of three boys that lives in Sherman Oaks who hires Liza to complete a puzzle as part of her son's homework.
John Gemberling as Rude Man ("Smile"), a man who tells Liza to smile whom she later tricks into inviting her back to his home by pretending to be a man.
Jessica Tuck as Orchid Owner ("Popular"), a woman who hires Liza to watch her orchid while she is on vacation.
Chloe Csengery as Alyssa ("Popular"), a student at Mary Richards High School that Liza befriends.
Froy Gutierrez as Doug ("Popular"), a popular jock at Mary Richards High School with a one-sided crush on Liza.
Matt McCoy as Clay Coburn ("Simpler Times"), a candidate for the United States Congress.
Morgan Smith as Martha ("Simpler Times"), an employee of the Coburn campaign.
Irene Keng as June ("Simpler Times"), a woman hired to attend a Coburn campaign rally because she is Asian-American.
Lindsey Alley as Elizabeth Coburn ("Simpler Times"), Clay Coburn's wife.
Eugene Cordero as Nigel ("Valentine's Day"), a Game of Thrones fan who enlists Liza's help to propose to his girlfriend.
Valerie Harper as Wanda ("Valentine's Day"), an older woman who is spending Valentine's Day alone and hires Liza to pick up her groceries.
Leonard Roberts as Marc ("Valentine's Day"), a man who hires Liza to help him break up with his boyfriend.
Greg Cromer as Todd ("Valentine's Day"), a man who hires Liza to deliver a Valentine's Day basket to his lover.
Tanjareen Thomas as Shannon ("Valentine's Day"), Todd's lover.
Kate Flannery as Karaoke Woman ("MoJoe"), a woman who hires Liza to take her karaoke machine to a repair shop for her.
Ken Lerner as Seymour F. ("Phuneral"), a man who hires Liza to deliver food to him and then gives her a one-star rating because the food is too cold.
Pete Gardner as Father Michaels ("Phuneral"), a priest presiding over Seymour's funeral.
Matt Malloy as Funeral Director ("Phuneral"), a funeral director at Golden Roads Mortuary, where Liza is hired to serve as a professional mourner.
Drew Droege as Sebastian Foyeé ("Elite Status"), a famous choreographer who meets Liza at a club after taking cough syrup and ayahuasca. He was under the impression that she was a good dancer while he was high and wanted her to tour with Lady Gaga.
Seth Morris as Rudy ("Elite Status"), the owner of Rudy's Escape Room, where Liza, Oliver, and Harlow go during a drunken stupor.
Flula Borg as Chris ("Elite Status"), an assistant to rapper Drake. He returns Liza's lost phone to her after she, Oliver, and Harlow spent time with Drake the previous evening.
Carolyn Hennesy as Cora Reeves ("What Up, Fam"), a wealthy woman who believes Liza is related to her thanks to a mix-up at a DNA company.
Josh Peck as Jonas ("Hot, Excited, and In Your Area"), a man who Liza meets that lives off the grid.
Kevin Nealon as Jim ("Sorry, Not Sorry"), a condescending marketing executive that Liza meets during a focus group testing.
Chrissie Fit as Katie ("Gentrification: The Musical"), a successful influencer that Liza did TaskIt training with.
Jason Nash as a guest ("New Year’s Eve"), a guest at Mrs. Schulz New Year's Eve party

Episodes

Season 1 (2018)

Season 2 (2019)

Season 3 (2021)

Production

Development
On November 17, 2017, it was announced that YouTube had given the production a series order for a first season consisting of eight episodes. In addition to starring in the series, Koshy was set to be an executive producer alongside Deborah Kaplan, Harry Elfont, and Courtney Carter. Sam Childs was set as a producer for the series. On January 29, 2018, it was announced that directors for the series were set to include Todd Biermann, Anna Mastro, Heath Cullens, Deborah Kaplan, and Harry Elfont. Kaplan and Elefont will write the series as well. On March 6, 2018, it was reported that the series was expected to be released on YouTube Red in May 2018, but it was later scheduled to premiere in June. On January 24, 2019, it was announced that the series had been renewed for a second season consisting of eight episodes which will premiere on September 25, 2019. On January 18, 2020, it was announced that the series had been renewed for a third season.

Casting
Alongside the initial series announcement, it was confirmed that Liza Koshy would star in the series. On January 29, 2018, it was announced that Kimiko Glenn and Travis Coles had been added to the main cast as series regulars.

Filming
The series was reported to be filming in Los Angeles in January 2018. After initial delays due to the COVID-19 pandemic, the first table read for the third season was held on January 29, 2021 and filming began the following week.

Release

Marketing
On June 3, 2018, Koshy released a video on her YouTube channel, featuring Glenn and Coles, revealing the first season premiere date to be June 27, 2018. A few days later, Koshy released the series' first official trailer. The trailer for season two was released in August 2019.

Premiere
On June 22, 2018, a "first look" at the series was held during the 9th Annual Vidcon online video conference at the Anaheim Convention Center in Anaheim, California. A question-and-answer session also took place moderated by Entertainment Weeklys Patrick Gomez and included creators Liza Koshy, Deborah Kaplan, and Harry Elfont, and cast members Kimiko Glenn and Travis Coles.

Reception

Critical response
In a positive review, Deciders Joel Keller recommended viewers stream the series saying, "Stream It. It's a surprisingly well-done show. The episode where Liza tries to retcon her high school experience is especially funny, because of jokes about her roomies acting like her parents and her attempts to not get labeled a pedophile (let's just say, she's really popular)." In a slightly more mixed critique, Robert Lloyd of The Los Angeles Times said that he found the first episode to be rather "ordinary" and "stiff" but that the second episode "goes to some familiar places – hello, I Love Lucy – but to some less expected ones as well and shows off Koshy to good effect, some effective physical comedy included. It made me laugh, anyway."

Awards and nominations

References

External links
 Liza on Demand YouTube playlist

2010s American comedy television series
2018 American television series debuts
2020s American comedy television series
2021 American television series endings
English-language television shows
Television shows set in Los Angeles
YouTube Premium original series